John Thomas Jutson (1874 – 14 November 1959) was an Australian geologist and lawyer.

Jutson was born in Melbourne and while working as a clerk in a law firm, studied geology part-time. He became geological research scholar, University of Melbourne 1909-10 and then worked for the Geological Survey of Western Australia 1911–18. He published The Physiography of Western Australia in 1916.

Jutson was awarded the Clarke Medal by the Royal Society of New South Wales in 1937.

References

External links
Bright Sparcs Archival and Heritage Sources on Jutson
CATALOGUE of PRE-1980 GEOLOGICAL PUBLICATIONS GEOLOGICAL SURVEY OF WESTERN AUSTRALIA - Lists several Bulletins authored by Jutson
Erosion and the Resulting Land Forms in Sub-Arid Western Australia, Including the Origin and Growth of the Dry Lakes - J. T. Jutson Geographical Journal, Vol. 50, No. 6 (Dec., 1917), pp. 418-434

1874 births
1959 deaths
Geologists from Melbourne